Worting is a former village and now a district of Basingstoke in Hampshire, England.

Worting may also refer to:

Worting Junction, Hampshire
Thomas Worting, MP for Hampshire (UK Parliament constituency)
Wort extracting, in brewing beer or whisky

See also
 Wort (disambiguation)
 Worthing (disambiguation)